Fort Lauderdale is a coastal city located in the U.S. state of Florida,  north of Miami along the Atlantic Ocean. It is the county seat of and largest city in Broward County with a population of 182,760 at the 2020 census, making it the tenth largest city in Florida. After Miami, Fort Lauderdale is the second principal city (as defined by the U.S. government) in the Miami metropolitan area, which had a population of 6,166,488 in 2019.

Built in 1838 and first incorporated in 1911, Fort Lauderdale is named after a series of forts built by the United States during the Second Seminole War. The forts took their name from Major William Lauderdale (1782–1838), younger brother of Lieutenant Colonel James Lauderdale. Development of the city did not begin until 50 years after the forts were abandoned at the end of the conflict. Three forts named "Fort Lauderdale" were constructed including the first at the fork of the New River, the second at Tarpon Bend on the New River between the present-day Colee Hammock and Rio Vista neighborhoods, and the third near the site of the Bahia Mar Marina.

Known as the “Venice of America", Fort Lauderdale has 165-miles of inland waterways across the city.

In addition to tourism, Fort Lauderdale has a diversified economy including marine, manufacturing, finance, insurance, real estate, high technology, avionics/aerospace, film, and television production. Greater Fort Lauderdale, encompassing all of Broward County, hosted more than 13 million overnight visitors in 2018. Each year nearly 4 million cruise passengers pass through its Port Everglades, making it the third largest cruise port in the world. With over 50,000 registered yachts and 100 marinas, Fort Lauderdale is also known as the yachting capital of the world."

History

The area in which the city of Fort Lauderdale would later be founded was inhabited for more than two thousand years by the Tequesta Indians. Contact with Spanish explorers in the 16th century proved disastrous for the Tequesta, as the Europeans unwittingly brought with them diseases, such as smallpox, to which the native populations possessed no resistance. For the Tequesta, disease, coupled with continuing conflict with their Calusa neighbors, contributed greatly to their decline over the next two centuries. By 1763, there were only a few Tequesta left in Florida, and most of them were evacuated to Cuba when the Spanish ceded Florida to the British in 1763, under the terms of the Treaty of Paris (1763), which ended the Seven Years' War. Although control of the area changed between Spain, the United Kingdom, the United States, and the Confederate States of America, it remained largely undeveloped until the 20th century.

The Fort Lauderdale area was known as the "New River Settlement" before the 20th century. In the 1830s, there were approximately 70 settlers living along the New River. William Cooley, the local Justice of the Peace, was a farmer and wrecker, who traded with the Seminole Indians. On January 6, 1836, while Cooley was leading an attempt to salvage a wrecked ship, a band of Seminoles attacked his farm, killing his wife and children, and the children's tutor. The other farms in the settlement were not attacked, but all the white residents in the area abandoned the settlement, fleeing first to the Cape Florida Lighthouse on Key Biscayne, and then to Key West.

The first United States stockade named Fort Lauderdale was built in 1838, and subsequently was a site of fighting during the Second Seminole War. The fort was abandoned in 1842, after the end of the war, and the area remained virtually unpopulated until the 1890s. It was not until Frank Stranahan arrived in the area in 1893 to operate a ferry across the New River, and the Florida East Coast Railroad's completion of a route through the area in 1896, that any organized development began. The city was incorporated in 1911, and in 1915, was designated the county seat of newly formed Broward County.

Fort Lauderdale's first major development began in the 1920s, during the Florida land boom. The 1926 Miami Hurricane and the Great Depression of the 1930s caused a great deal of economic dislocation. In July 1935, an African-American man named Rubin Stacy was accused of robbing a white woman at knifepoint. He was arrested and being transported to a Miami jail when police were run off the road by a mob. A group of 100 white men proceeded to hang Stacy from a tree near the scene of his alleged robbery. His body was riddled with some 20 bullets. The murder was subsequently used by the press in Nazi Germany to discredit U.S. critiques of its own persecution of Jews, Communists, and Catholics.

When World War II began, Fort Lauderdale became a major U.S. base, with a Naval Air Station to train pilots, radar operators, and fire control operators. A Coast Guard base at Port Everglades was also established.

Until July 1961, only whites were allowed on Ft. Lauderdale beaches. There were no beaches for African-Americans in Broward County until 1954, when "the Colored Beach," today Dr. Von D. Mizell-Eula Johnson State Park, was opened in Dania Beach; however, no road was built to it until 1965. On July 4, 1961, African Americans started a series of wade-ins as protests at beaches that were off-limits to them, to protest "the failure of the county to build a road to the Negro beach." On July 11, 1962, a verdict by Ted Cabot went against the city's policy of racial segregation of public beaches, and Broward County beaches were desegregated in 1962.

Today, Fort Lauderdale is a major yachting center, one of the nation's largest tourist destinations, and the center of a metropolitan division with 1.8 million people.

Population size
After the war ended, service members returned to the area, spurring an enormous population explosion that dwarfed the 1920s boom. The 1960 census counted 83,648 people in the city, about 230% of the 1950 figure. A 1967 report estimated that the city was approximately 85% developed, and the 1970 population figure was 139,590.

After 1970, as Fort Lauderdale became essentially built out, growth in the area shifted to suburbs to the west. As cities such as Coral Springs, Miramar, and Pembroke Pines experienced explosive growth, Fort Lauderdale's population stagnated, and the city actually shrank by almost 4,000 people between 1980, when the city had 153,279 people, and 1990, when the population was 149,377. A slight rebound brought the population back up to 152,397 at the 2000 census. Since 2000, Fort Lauderdale has gained slightly over 18,000 residents through annexation of seven neighborhoods in unincorporated Broward County.

Geography

Location

The city of Fort Lauderdale is adjacent to the Atlantic Ocean, includes  of beaches, and borders the following municipalities:

On its east:
 Lauderdale-by-the-Sea
 Sea Ranch Lakes
 Victoria Park
On its south:
 Hollywood
 Dania Beach
On its southwest:
 Davie
On its west:
 Plantation
 Lauderhill
 Lauderdale Lakes
On its northwest:
 North Lauderdale
 Oakland Park
 Tamarac
On its north:
 Wilton Manors
 Pompano Beach

The northwestern section of Fort Lauderdale is separate from the remainder of the city, connected only by the Cypress Creek Canal as it flows under I-95. This section of Fort Lauderdale borders the cities of Tamarac and Oakland Park on its south side. Oakland Park also borders Fort Lauderdale on the west side of its northeastern portion. The greater portion of Fort Lauderdale in the south is bordered, along its north side by Wilton Manors.

Off the coast of Fort Lauderdale is the Osborne Reef, an artificial reef made of discarded tires that has proven to be an ecological disaster. The dumping began in the 1960s, with the intent of providing habitat for fish, while disposing of trash from the land. However, in the rugged and corrosive environment of the ocean, nylon straps used to secure the tires wore out, cables rusted, and tires broke free. The tires posed a particular threat after breaking free from their restraints. The tires then migrated shoreward, and ran into a living reef tract, washed up on its slope, and killed many things in their path. In recent years, thousands of tires have also washed up on nearby beaches, especially during hurricanes. Local authorities are now working to remove the 700,000 tires, in cooperation with the U.S. Army, Navy, and Coast Guard.

Neighborhoods

Fort Lauderdale has a program for designating and recognizing neighborhoods. Under the Neighborhood Organization Recognition Program, more than 60 distinct neighborhoods have received official recognition from the city. An additional 25–30 neighborhoods exist without official recognition, although the city's neighborhood map displays them as well.

Climate
According to the Köppen climate classification, Fort Lauderdale has a tropical rainforest climate (Köppen Af), landing just above a tropical monsoon climate (Köppen Am) in terms of precipitation. While the city does not have a true dry season, much of the seasonal rainfall comes between May and October. Winters are frequently dry and sunny, and drought can be a concern in some years.

Fort Lauderdale is situated in USDA hardiness zone 10b.

During this period, more than half of summer days may bring brief afternoon or evening thunderstorms with lightning and bursts of intense rainfall.

The dry season often arrives some time in November, and lasts through early to mid April. Seasonable weather is often warm, dry, and sunny. On rare occasions, cool fronts may make it all the way south to Fort Lauderdale, and the city will see a day or two of highs in the 60s °F (16–21 °C) and lows in the 40s °F (4–10 °C). Rare frosts occur every few decades, and only once in recorded history have snow flurries been reported in the air, which occurred on January 19, 1977. During the dry season (winter), brush fires can be a concern in many years.

However, rainfall occurs in all months, even during the drier months from November through April. Fort Lauderdale has an average of 131 precipitation days annually. The hurricane season is between June 1 and November 30, with major hurricanes most likely to affect the city or state in September and October. The most recent storms to directly affect the city were Hurricane Irma in 2017, in addition to Hurricane Katrina and Hurricane Wilma, both of which struck the city in 2005. Other direct hits were Hurricane Cleo in 1964, Hurricane King in 1950, and the 1947 Fort Lauderdale Hurricane.

Demographics

2020 census

As of the 2020 United States census, there were 182,760 people, 76,348 households, and 37,859 families residing in the city.

2010 census

, those of (non-Hispanic white) European ancestry accounted for 52.5% of Fort Lauderdale's population. Out of the 52.5%, 10.3% were Irish, 10.1% German, 8.1% Italian, 7.1% English, 3.0% Polish, 2.1% French, 1.9% Russian, 1.7% Scottish, 1.2% Scotch-Irish, 1.0% Dutch, 1.0% Swedish, 0.6% Greek, 0.6% Hungarian, 0.5% Norwegian, and 0.5% were French Canadian.

, those of African ancestry accounted for 31.0% of Fort Lauderdale's population, which includes African Americans. Out of the 31.0%, 10.0% were West Indian or Afro-Caribbean American (6.4% Haitian, 2.5% Jamaican, 0.4% Bahamian, 0.2% Other or Unspecified West Indian, 0.2% British West Indian, 0.1% Trinidadian and Tobagonian, 0.1% Barbadian), 0.6% were Black Hispanics, and 0.5% were Subsaharan African.

, those of Hispanic or Latino ancestry accounted for 13.7% of Fort Lauderdale's population. Out of the 13.7%, 2.5% were Cuban, 2.3% Puerto Rican, 1.7% Mexican, 1.1% Colombian, 0.9% Guatemalan, 0.8% Salvadoran, 0.6% Honduran, and 0.6% were Peruvian.

, those of Asian ancestry accounted for 1.5% of Fort Lauderdale's population. Out of the 1.5%, 0.4% were Indian, 0.3% Filipino, 0.3% Other Asian, 0.2% Chinese, 0.1% Vietnamese, 0.1% Japanese, and 0.1% were Korean.

, 0.6% were of Arab ancestry.

In 2010, 7.1% of the population considered themselves to be of only American ancestry (regardless of race or ethnicity).

, there were 74,786 occupied households, while 19.7% were vacant. 17.7% had children under the age of 18 living with them, 30.4% were married couples living together, 12.3% have a female head of household with no husband present, and 52.4% were non-families. 39.4% of all households were made up of individuals, and 11.1% had someone living alone who was 65 years of age or older (4.8% male and 6.3% female.) The average household size was 2.17 and the average family size was 3.00.

In 2010, the city population was spread out, with 17.6% under the age of 18, 8.1% from 18 to 24, 28.4% from 25 to 44, 30.6% from 45 to 64, and 15.3% who were 65 years of age or older. The median age was 42.2 years. For every 100 females, there were 111.8 males. For every 100 females age 18 and over, there were 113.1 males.

, the median income for a household in the city was $49,818, and the median income for a family was $59,238. Males had a median income of $46,706 versus $37,324 for females. The per capita income for the city was $35,828. About 13.1% of families and 18.2% of the population were below the poverty line, including 30.3% of those under age 18 and 12.5% of those aged 65 or over.

In 2010, 21.3% of the city's population was foreign-born. Of foreign-born residents, 69.6% were born in Latin America and 15.3% were born in Europe, with smaller percentages from North America, Africa, Asia, and Oceania.

In 2000, Fort Lauderdale had the twenty-sixth highest percentage of Haitian residents in the US, at 6.9% of the city's population, and the 127th highest percentage of Cuban residents, at 1.7% of the city's residents.

Like South Florida in general, Fort Lauderdale has many residents who can speak languages other than English, although its proportion is lower than the county average. , 75.63% of the population spoke only English at home, while 24.37% spoke other first languages. Speakers of Spanish were 9.43%, French Creole (mostly Haitian Creole) 7.52%, French 2.04%, Portuguese 1.02%, Italian 0.82%, and German at 0.80%.

The city, along with adjacent small cities Oakland Park and Wilton Manors, is known for its notably large LGBT community, and has one of the highest ratios of gay men and lesbians, with gay men being more largely present. The city is also known as a popular vacation spot for gays and lesbians, with many LGBT or LGBT-friendly hotels and guesthouses. Fort Lauderdale hosts the Stonewall Library & Archives, and in neighboring Wilton Manors, there is the Pride Center, a large LGBT community center, in addition to the World AIDS Museum and Educational Center. The current Mayor of Fort Lauderdale, Dean Trantalis, is the first openly gay person to hold this office.

Economy

Fort Lauderdale's economy has diversified over time. From the 1940s through the 1980s, the city was known as a spring break destination for college students. The college crowd has since dwindled, however, with the city now attracting wealthier tourists. Cruise ships and nautical recreation provide the basis for much of the revenue raised by tourism. Approximately 30% of the city's 10 million annual visitors attend conventions at the center.

The downtown area, especially around Las Olas Boulevard, first underwent redevelopment starting in 2002,  and now hosts many new hotels and high-rise condominium developments.  The city's central business district is the largest downtown in Broward County, although there are other cities in the county with commercial centers. Office buildings and high-rises include: Las Olas River House, Las Olas Grand, 110 Tower (formerly AutoNation Tower), Bank of America Plaza, One Financial Plaza, Broward Financial Center, One East Broward Boulevard, Barnett Bank Plaza, PNC Center, New River Center, One Corporate Center, SunTrust Centre, 101 Tower, and SouthTrust Tower.

Fort Lauderdale is a major manufacturing and maintenance center for yachts. The boating industry is responsible for over 109,000 jobs in the county. With its many canals, and proximity to the Bahamas and Caribbean, it is also a popular yachting vacation stop, and home port for 42,000 boats, and approximately 100 marinas and boatyards. Additionally, the annual Fort Lauderdale International Boat Show, the world's largest boat show, brings over 125,000 people to the city each year.

Top employers

According to the Greater Fort Lauderdale Alliance 2020 report, the city's top employers include:

Companies based in the Fort Lauderdale and Broward County area include, but not limited to: AutoNation, Citrix Systems, Commcare Pharmacy, DHL Express, KEMET Corporation, SEACOR Holdings, Spirit Airlines, and National Beverage Corporation. The largest employers in the county are Tenet Healthcare, which employs 5,000 people; American Express, which employs 4,200; FirstService Residential, which employs 3,900; Motorola, which employs 3,000; and Maxim Integrated Products, which employs 2,000.

Gulfstream International Airlines, a commuter airline, is headquartered in nearby Dania Beach.

Fort Lauderdale was recently listed as 2017's third best city out of 150 U.S. cities by WalletHub for summer jobs, and the 24th best city to start a career in.

Arts and culture

Like many parts of Florida, the city's population has a strong seasonal variation, as "snowbirds" from the northern United States, Canada, and Europe spend the winter and spring in Florida. The city is known for its beaches, bars, nightclubs, and history as a spring break location, back in the 1960s and 1970s, for tens of thousands of college students. The city has discouraged college students from visiting the area since the mid-1980s, however, by passing strict laws aimed at preventing the mayhem that occurred in the 1970s and 1980s. The city had an estimated 350,000 college visitors for spring break 1985; by 1989, that number had declined to about 20,000. Since the 1990s, Fort Lauderdale has increasingly catered to those seeking the resort lifestyle seasonally or year-round, and is often a host city to many professional venues, concerts, and art shows.

Fort Lauderdale's arts and entertainment district, otherwise known as the Riverwalk Arts & Entertainment District, runs east–west along Las Olas Boulevard, from the beach to the heart of downtown. The district is anchored in the West by the Broward Center for the Performing Arts, and runs through the city to the intersection of Las Olas and A1A. This intersection is the "ground zero" of Fort Lauderdale Beach, and is the site of the Elbo Room bar featured in the 1960 film Where the Boys Are, which led in large measure to the city's former reputation as a spring break mecca. The city and its suburbs host over 4,100 restaurants and over 120 nightclubs, many of them in the arts and entertainment district. The city is also the setting for the 1986 movie Flight of the Navigator, and host of Langerado, an annual music festival. In 2013, the county welcomed about 1.3 million LGBT travelers who spent about $1.5 billion in area restaurants, hotels, attractions, and shops, according to the Greater Fort Lauderdale Convention & Visitors Bureau.

Film festival

The Fort Lauderdale International Film Festival has been presented annually since 1986.

Sites of interest

Hugh Taylor Birch State Park is a  park along the beach, with nature trails, camping and picnicking areas, canoeing, and features the Terramar Visitor Center, with exhibits about the ecosystem of the park. Hugh Taylor Birch came to Florida in 1893. He purchased ocean-front property for about a dollar per acre, he eventually owned a 3.5-mile stretch of beachfront. The Bonnet House is a historic home in Fort Lauderdale, Florida, United States. Bonnet House's modern history began when Birch gave the Bonnet House property as a wedding gift to his daughter, Helen, and her husband, Chicago artist Frederic Clay Bartlett in 1919. The site was listed on the National Register of Historic places in 1984, and declared a historic landmark by the City of Fort Lauderdale in 2002.

Henry E. Kinney Tunnel on U.S. Route 1 is the only tunnel on a state road in the state of Florida. It was constructed in 1960, and its  length travels underneath the New River and Las Olas Boulevard.

Just minutes from the beach is the Riverwalk Arts and Entertainment District in downtown Fort Lauderdale, home to cultural attractions, shops, parks, and restaurants. Along the Riverwalk's brick-lined meandering promenade, visitors can enjoy many attractions, such as: the Broward Center for the Performing Arts; Museum of Discovery and Science, with its AutoNation 3D IMAX Theater; Florida Grand Opera; Fort Lauderdale Historical Center; Stranahan House; and the Museum of Art.

Las Olas Boulevard is a popular thoroughfare in downtown Fort Lauderdale that runs from Andrews Avenue in the Central Business District to A1A and Fort Lauderdale Beach. The boulevard is a popular attraction for locals and visitors, being ideally situated close to Fort Lauderdale beach, Fort Lauderdale-Hollywood International Airport, and Port Everglades. It is considered to be South Florida's most architecturally unique, authentic, and eclectic shopping and dining district.

In addition to its museums, beaches, and nightlife, Fort Lauderdale is home to: the Fort Lauderdale Swap Shop, a large indoor/outdoor flea market, and the site of the world's largest drive-in movie theater, with 13 screens; North Woodlawn Cemetery, an African-American cemetery east of Interstate 95 near Sunrise Boulevard, which was added to the National Register of Historic Places in 2017; Calvary Chapel Fort Lauderdale, an evangelical megachurch in Fort Lauderdale; and the annual Fort Lauderdale International Boat Show, where almost 500 boats, yachts, and mega-yachts are on display.

Historic structures
The following are images of some of the remaining historical structures in Fort Lauderdale. Some are listed in the National Register of Historic Places:

Sports
Lockhart Stadium in Fort Lauderdale was the home of the Fort Lauderdale Strikers, which played in the most recent incarnation of the North American Soccer League. It was the home of the original Fort Lauderdale Strikers, which played in the previous version of the North American Soccer League. The Miami Fusion of Major League Soccer played home games at this stadium from 1998 to 2001. The Florida Atlantic University Owls football team played its home games at Lockhart Stadium from 2003 through 2010.

The New York Yankees, Baltimore Orioles, and Kansas City Royals used to conduct spring training in the city at Fort Lauderdale Stadium.

Fort Lauderdale is also home to the Fort Lauderdale Aquatic Complex, which is at the International Swimming Hall of Fame. It contains two  by 50-meter competition pools, as well as one 20 by  diving well. The complex is open to Fort Lauderdale residents, and has also been used in many different national and international competitions since its opening in 1965. Ten world records have been set there, from Catie Ball's 100 m breaststroke in 1966, to Michael Phelps' 400 m individual medley in 2002.

DRV PNK Stadium was opened in 2020 as the home of Inter Miami CF II (then Fort Lauderdale CF) which played in USL League One from 2020 to 2021 and plays in MLS Next Pro from 2022, and the temporary home of 2020 MLS expansion team Inter Miami CF, until the completion of Miami Freedom Park in Miami.

The War Memorial Auditorium has hosted professional wrestling, boxing, and mixed martial arts shows since its opening in 1950. In 2019, the Florida Panthers signed a 50-year lease with the venue, with plans to renovate it and add hockey facilities.

Government

Fort Lauderdale has a Commission-Manager form of government. City policy is set by a city commission of five elected members: the mayor and four district commission members. In 1998, the municipal code was amended to limit the mayoral term. The mayor of Fort Lauderdale now serves a three-year term, and cannot serve more than three consecutive terms. The current mayor is Dean Trantalis, who succeeded Jack Seiler in 2018. The longest-serving mayor is Jim Naugle, who served from 1991 to 2009. Administrative functions are performed by a city manager, who is appointed by the city commission. Fort Lauderdale Fire-Rescue Department provides Fire and Emergency Medical Services.

The town of Fort Lauderdale council in 1911 appointed Kossie A. Goodbread as its first City Marshal. G. D. Tenbrook, appointed Marshal in 1920, was the first to receive the title of Chief of Police.  Between 1924 and 1926, the size of the Fort Lauderdale Police Department increased from two officers to 26 officers. Scott Israel, later the Sheriff of Broward County and the Opa-locka Police Chief, worked for the Fort Lauderdale Police Department from 1979 to 2004. As of 2022, the department had 499 officers.

Education

According to 2000 census data, 79.0% of the city's population aged 25 or older were high school graduates, slightly below the national figure of 80.4%. Additionally, 27.9% held at least a baccalaureate, slightly higher than the national figure of 24.4%. Broward County Public Schools operates 23 public schools in Fort Lauderdale. The 2007 Florida Comprehensive Assessment Test (FCAT) results for Fort Lauderdale's public schools were mixed; while 10 (of 16) elementary schools and one (of four) middle schools received "A" or "B" grades, Sunland Park Elementary School and Arthur Ashe Middle School received failing grades. Boyd Anderson High School, which is in Lauderdale Lakes but whose attendance zone includes part of Fort Lauderdale, also received a failing grade. None of the three failing schools have failed twice in a four-year period, thus triggering the "Opportunity Scholarship Program" school choice provisions of the Florida's education plan.

Ten institutions of higher learning have main or satellite campuses in the city:

 The Art Institute of Fort Lauderdale
 Broward College BC (Willis Holcombe Downtown Center)
 City College
 Embry-Riddle Aeronautical University (satellite campus)
 Florida Atlantic University FAU (satellite campus)
 Florida International University FIU (satellite campus)
 Keiser University
 Jersey College
 Nova Southeastern University NSU
 University of Phoenix (Cypress Creek Learning Center)

Additionally, the Davenport, Iowa-based Kaplan University's Corporate headquarters and an academic support center are in the city.

Media

Fort Lauderdale is served by English-language newspapers South Florida-Sun Sentinel and The Miami Herald, Spanish-language newspapers El Sentinel, El Nuevo Herald, and an alternative newspaper New Times Broward-Palm Beach.

Transportation

Transit

Broward County Transit (BCT), the county bus system, provides local bus transportation. BCT provides for connections with the bus systems in other parts of the metropolitan area: Metrobus in Dade County, and Palm Tran in Palm Beach County. Tri-Rail, a commuter rail system, connects south Florida's major cities and airports. In November 2006, Broward County voters rejected a one-cent-per-hundred sales tax increase intended to fund transportation projects, such as light rail and bus system expansion.
The Wave (streetcar), a new  electric streetcar system costing $125 million, was being planned for the downtown. Most of the construction funding would have come from federal ($62.5 million), state ($37 million), and city taxpayers ($10.5 million), with approximately $15 million from assessments on properties within the Downtown Development Authority. Broward County (BCT) had committed to operating the system for the first 10 years at an expected annual cost of $2 million, and had guaranteed funding to cover any shortfall in ridership revenues.  The construction cost of $50 million per mile was considerably higher than other recently built streetcar projects, in part due to the challenges of building an electric transit system over the 3rd Avenue drawbridge. The project was canceled in 2018 by the City and the county.

The Sun Trolley is a bus service, running buses (styled as streetcars) around Fort Lauderdale and Broward County.

Passenger Rail

Brightline has a station in Fort Lauderdale, which connects to Miami and West Palm Beach with multiple trains daily. Construction is underway to extend the line beyond West Palm Beach to Orlando by 2023.

Tri-Rail also provides daily commuter service between Palm Beach County, Broward County (including two stations in Fort Lauderdale), and Miami-Dade County with dozens of local stations. Amtrak provides long-distance passenger service daily on the Silver Meteor and Silver Star lines connecting to cities on the Atlantic coast via the Fort Lauderdale station.

Airports

Fort Lauderdale-Hollywood International Airport, near Dania Beach, Florida, is the city's main airport and is the fastest-growing major airport in the country as of 2005. This was, in part, attributable to service by low-cost carriers, such as Spirit Airlines, JetBlue Airways, Southwest Airlines and Silver Airways, resulting in lower airfares than nearby Miami International Airport.

Fort Lauderdale-Hollywood is an emerging international gateway for the Caribbean and Latin America. Miami International Airport and Palm Beach International Airport also serve the city.

Waterways
Fort Lauderdale is home to Port Everglades, the nation's third busiest cruise port. It is Florida's deepest port, and is an integral petroleum receiving point. Fort Lauderdale is served by a regular international passenger ferry service to Freeport, Grand Bahama Island, Bahamas operated by Baleària Caribbean.

Roads
Broward County is served by three major Interstate Highways (I-75, I-95, I-595) and U.S. Highways, such as U.S. 1, US 27 and US 441. The interchange between I-95 and I-595/SR 862 is known as the Rainbow Interchange. It is also served by Florida's Turnpike and State Highway 869, also known as the Sawgrass Expressway.

Healthcare

Fort Lauderdale is served by Broward General Medical Center and Imperial Point Medical Center, which are operated by Broward Health, the third-largest hospital consortium in the United States. Broward General is a 716-bed acute care facility that is designated as a Level I trauma center. It is also home to Chris Evert Children's Hospital and a Heart Center of Excellence. The hospital serves as a major training site for medical students from Nova Southeastern University's College of Osteopathic Medicine, as well as nursing and paramedic programs from throughout the area.

Imperial Point Medical Center is a 204-bed facility with a hyperbaric medicine program. Holy Cross Hospital, a 571-bed hospital operated by the Sisters of Mercy, was named by HealthGrades as one of the 50 best hospitals in the country for 2007.

Sister cities
Fort Lauderdale's sister cities are:

 Agogo, Ghana
 Belo Horizonte, Brazil
 Cap-Haïtien, Haiti
 Duisburg, Germany
 Gold Coast, Australia
 Haifa, Israel
 Kaohsiung, Taiwan
 Mar del Plata, Argentina
 Margarita Island, Venezuela
 Mataró, Spain
 Medellín, Colombia
 Muğla, Turkey
 Panama City, Panama
 Quepos, Costa Rica
 Rimini, Italy
 La Romana, Dominican Republic
 São Sebastião, Brazil

See also

 List of people from Fort Lauderdale, Florida
 List of sister cities of Fort Lauderdale, Florida
 List of tallest buildings in Fort Lauderdale

References

External links

 

 
1911 establishments in Florida
Beaches of Broward County, Florida
Beaches of Florida
Cities in Broward County, Florida
Cities in Florida
County seats in Florida
Gay villages in Florida
Populated coastal places in Florida on the Atlantic Ocean
Populated places established in 1911
Port cities and towns of the Florida Atlantic coast
Seaside resorts in Florida